Infectious Diseases (formerly Scandinavian Journal of Infectious Diseases) is a peer-reviewed medical journal publishing original research and review articles on clinical and microbiological aspects of infectious diseases.

Core topics 
 clinical aspects of infectious diseases
 laboratory investigations of clinical significance (bacteriological, virological, parasitological, mycological, immunological, pathological, physiological, chemical and pharmacological)
 epidemiological and epizootological studies of human infections
 experimental infections

Publisher 
Infectious Diseases is published by Informa Healthcare, a trading division in Informa plc, a United Kingdom-based publisher.

Editor-in-Chief 

The current editor in chief is Ragnar Norrby. He is chairman of the Board of Trustees of the International Vaccine Institute and was the Director-General of the Swedish Institute for Infectious Disease Control (SMI) until June 2009. He has also acted as chairman of the Swedish Society of Medicine and served as Professor at Lund University between 1988 and 2000.

References

External links 
 Scandinavian Journal of Infectious Diseases 
 Informa Healthcare homepage of Informa Healthcare which publishes Scandinavian Journal of Infectious Diseases

Publications established in 1969
Microbiology journals
Taylor & Francis academic journals
Monthly journals
English-language journals